Charles Nicolo Caputo (March 21, 1912 – September 14, 1986) is a former Democratic member of the Pennsylvania House of Representatives.

References

Democratic Party members of the Pennsylvania House of Representatives
1986 deaths
1912 births
20th-century American politicians